The 2015–16 season is Dundee United's 107th season, having been founded as Dundee Hibernian in 1909 and their third season in the Scottish Premiership. United will also compete in the League Cup and the Scottish Cup.

Summary

Management
They began the season under the management of Jackie McNamara, who was on a long term contract until 2017. On 26 September 2015, following the club's defeat to St Johnstone, McNamara was relieved of his duties as manager of the club, however he still remained an employee of Dundee United. The following day McNamara and his backroom staff Simon Donnelly, Darren Jackson and Craig Hinchcliffe officially left the club. Assistant youth coach Dave Bowman became caretaker manager.

On 14 October, United appointed former player Mixu Paatelainen as head coach. His first game in charge was versus Heart of Midlothian on 18 October. Paatelainen left his position as manager after United's relegation to the championship was confirmed in May 2016 with coach Gordon Young placed in charge for the remaining three games of the season.

Results & fixtures

Pre season / Friendlies

Scottish Premiership

Scottish League Cup

Scottish Cup

Squad statistics
During the 2015–16 season, Dundee United have used thirty-four different players in competitive games. 

|-
|colspan="12"|Players who left the club during the 2015–16 season
|-

Disciplinary record

Team statistics

League table

Management statistics
Last updated on 14 May 2016

Division summary

Transfers

In

Out

See also
 List of Dundee United F.C. seasons

Notes

References

Dundee United
Dundee United F.C. seasons